Thomas H. Beeby (born 1941) is an American architect who was a member of the "Chicago Seven" architects and has been Chairman Emeritus of Hammond, Beeby, Rupert, Ainge Architects (HBRA) for over thirty-nine years.

He is a representative of New Urbanism and New Classical Architecture.

Biography and career

An Oak Park, Illinois native, Beeby received a bachelor's degree in architecture from Cornell in 1964 and master’s from Yale in 1965. In 1971, Beeby and James Hammond founded Hammond Beeby & Associates (now HBRA). After teaching for six years at the Illinois Institute of Technology and serving as Director of the University of Illinois at Chicago School of Architecture, he served from 1985 to 1992  as Dean of the Yale School of Architecture, where he remains an Adjunct Professor. Beeby was elected to the College of Fellows of the American Institute of Architects in 1991.

As one of the “Chicago Seven” architects who challenged modernist orthodoxy in the 1970s and 1980s, Beeby helped bring traditional architecture and urban design back into the public consciousness. Pulitzer Prize-winning Chicago Tribune architecture critic Blair Kamin, reflecting on the group’s influence in 2005, commended the “critical spirit that helped the Chicago Seven alter the course of the city’s architecture.”

Chairman Emeritus of Hammond Beeby Rupert Ainge Architects (HBRA), Beeby spent over 40 years as the firm’s Director of Design, leading projects such as the James Baker Institute at Rice University, Meadows Museum at Southern Methodist University, the Bass Library at Yale University, and the United States Federal Building and Courthouse in Tuscaloosa, Alabama. Seven of Beeby’s projects have received the National Honor Award, the highest design distinction, from the American Institute of Architects, including the Hole in the Wall Gang Camp for Paul Newman in Ashford, Connecticut, the Rice Wing at the Art Institute of Chicago, and the master plan for Paternoster Square in London with John Simpson and Terry Farrell.  Progressive Architecture cited three of Beeby’s public library designs, including the Sulzer Regional Library and the Harold Washington Library Center in Chicago.

Major projects

American Academy of Pediatrics headquarters, Itasca, Illinois, USA
Bannockburn Green Retail Center, Bannockburn, Illinois, USA
United States Federal Building and Courthouse, Tuscaloosa, Alabama
Daniel F. and Ada L. Rice Building, Art Institute of Chicago, Sculpture Court
Taft School, New Athletic Facility, Watertown, Connecticut
Hole in the Wall Gang Camp, Ashford, Connecticut
Harris Theater for Music and Dance, Chicago, Illinois, USA

1985 to 1992 Dean of the Yale School of Architecture Initiatives & Projects
 Supported and encouraged Yale Journal of Architecture and Feminism

Awards
In 2013 Beeby was awarded the 11th Driehaus Architecture Prize.  The Driehaus Prize, administered by the University of Notre Dame, is the world's best-known prize for contemporary classical and traditional architecture. He received $200,000 and a bronze miniature of the Choragic Monument of Lysicrates.

See also
Chicago Seven
Richard H. Driehaus Prize for Classical Architecture

References

External links
 HBRA Architects
 HBRA Architects, Thomas H. Beeby
  feat. Beeby, Driehaus Prize colloquium, Notre Dame School of Architecture

Cornell University College of Architecture, Art, and Planning alumni
Yale School of Architecture alumni
1941 births
Artists from Oak Park, Illinois
Living people
New Classical architects
Driehaus Architecture Prize winners
21st-century American architects
20th-century American architects